Luis Yanza (born 1962 in Gualaceo) is an environmental activist from Ecuador, of Cofán descent. He serves as president of the Frente de Defensa de la Amazonia (Amazon Defense Front), an NGO representing the interests of the campesinos and indigenous peoples in Ecuador.

Honors
Yanza received the Goldman Environment Prize in 2008, along with Pablo Fajardo Mendoza. The two have been organizing indigenous communities in Ecuador to fight against international oil companies, in order to clean up devastated areas in the Ecuadorian jungle, which has become polluted from years of oil production.

Yanza and Fajardo's publication of the environmental effects from oil production has led to stronger environmental protection laws in Ecuador.

Legal action
As president of the Frente de Defensa de la Amazonia, Yanza has spearheaded a multibillion-dollar class action lawsuit against Chevron-Texaco for its environmental damage in Ecuador. With Steven Donziger and others, he represented 30,000 indigenous people and farmers affected by the Lago Agrio oil field. Yanza stated that the "trial is not about accidental damages. We´re talking about harm to people and the environment that was done in a deliberate manner."

The Ecuadorian courts, which were originally requested by Chevron, ruled in favour of the plaintiffs on three occasions. After being ordered to pay $9.5 billion, Chevron refused and presented a defence that Ecuadorian judge Nicolás Zambrano accepted a $500,000 bribe in exchange for ruling against them. This was called into question in 2015 when Alberto Guerra, the alleged witness to the bribery, recanted.

Notes

References
Handler, Marisa. Loyal to the Sky: Notes from an Activist. San Francisco: Berrett-Koehler Publishers, 2007. .

External links
Pablo Fajardo and Luis Yanza, profile and video

1962 births
Living people
People from Gualaceo
Ecuadorian environmentalists
Indigenous people of the Amazon
Indigenous activists of the Americas
Goldman Environmental Prize awardees